Evans Site may refer to:

Evans Site (Tonganoxie, Kansas), listed on the National Register of Historic Places in Leavenworth County, Kansas
Croley-Evans Site (15KX24), Rockhold, Kentucky, listed on the National Register of Historic Places in Knox County, Kentucky
Evans Site (New Town, North Dakota), listed on the National Register of Historic Places in Mountrail County, North Dakota